Macrosoma albistria is moth-like butterfly described by Louis Beethoven Prout in 1916. It belongs to the family Hedylidae. Originally it belonged to the genus Phellinodes. Malcolm J. Scoble combined it with Macrosoma in 1986.

Distribution
The species is found in the central and southern Peru: Carabaya Province, La Unión Province; southern Bolivia.

Description

Male

Wings
Male M. albistria has wings of greyish brown ground colour. The apex of the forewing is dark brown and weakly emarginate. The dark apical has three 3 small white marks at proximal edge. The termen has poorly defined whitish weak dark streak from the costa. Spot is found medially along the costa. The hindwing is small glassy and has patch at the base.
The length of the forewing is 17–20 mm.

Genitalia
Following are the characteristics of the genitalia:
 The medial element of Gnathos is tongue-shaped, with minute denticles, weakly downcurved and laterally denticulate.
 Valva is narrow.

Antenna
The antenna is not bipectinate.

Diagnosis
This species is distinguished from M. coscoja by the weaker downcurving of the gnathos, and by the shape of the valva. The forewing of M. albistria lacks the narrow, postmedial streak which is found in M. coscoja. The glassy patch at the base of the hindwing is present in M. albistria but absent in M. coscoja.

References
 Macrosoma albistria - Overview - Encyclopedia of Life.
 Catalogue of Life.
 A catalogue of the Hedylidae (Lepidoptera: Hedyloidea), with descriptions of two new species..
  An identification guide to the Hedylidae (Lepidoptera: Hedyloidea)..

Sources

Hedylidae
Butterflies described in 1916
Taxa named by Louis Beethoven Prout
Hedylidae of South America